Wilmer is a city in Dallas County, Texas, United States. The population was 3,682 at the 2010 census. It is part of the Dallas–Fort Worth–Arlington Metropolitan Statistical Area.

Geography

Wilmer is located at  (32.590743, –96.682619).

History
The area was initially settled by Andrew K. Gray before 1850. The settlement was originally known as Prairie Valley when the Houston and Texas Central Railroad arrived in 1872. In 1884, the post office in Prairie Valley was renamed Wilmer, after A.J. Wilmer, a conductor on the Houston and Texas Central line. The population was estimated at 100 in 1890, with several stores and businesses operation in the community. That figure had risen to over 200 by the start of World War I. A fire destroyed most of Wilmer's business district on July 4, 1929. The community's shallow wells were unable to pump the adequate amount of water needed to extinguish the blaze.

Wilmer incorporated in 1945, and its first mayor, J.H. May, was elected on a platform of installing a water system. At the time of incorporation, Wilmer had 136 homes and a population of approximately 450. In 1949, a volunteer fire department was established and a fire truck was purchased. Around the same time, Wilmer and the neighboring city of Hutchins consolidated their schools. By 1960, Wilmer was home to 1,785 residents. Throughout the latter half of the twentieth century, Wilmer continued to grow, but at a much slower rate than other communities in Dallas County. With 3,393 residents as of the 2000 census, Wilmer is currently one of the smallest incorporated cities in Dallas County.

Demographics

As of the 2020 United States census, there were 4,974 people, 1,576 households, and 1,095 families residing in the city.

Economy

Union Pacific's Dallas Intermodal Terminal is located partly in the city of Wilmer and partly in the city of Hutchins. The shipping facility, built by AUI Contractors, Prime Rail Interests and Halff Associates, was a 70 million U.S. dollar project.  After Union Pacific (UP) chose Wilmer for its global intermodal facility, the City attracted Fortune 500 companies like Unilever, Procter & Gamble, Whirlpool, Ace Hardware and Medline. Wilmer offers easy access to all regional Interstates (I-45, I-20, I-30), U.S. Highways, and both international and general aviation airports (Lancaster, DFW International, Love Field).

Wilmer offers a low tax rate along with incentives that include City Tax Abatements,  Economic Development Sales Tax Funds, City of Wilmer Sales Tax – 380 agreements, Triple Freeport Exemptions, State of Texas Programs, Dallas County Tax Abatements, Federal Programs including New Market Tax Credits,  and a Foreign Trade Zone (FTZ).

Education
Wilmer is served by the Dallas Independent School District. The area is within the Board of Trustees District 5; as of 2008 Lew Blackburn represents the district. As of fall 2011 the area is zoned to Eddie Bernice Johnson Elementary School, Kennedy-Curry Middle School, and Wilmer-Hutchins High School.

In 2015 the Wilmer Early Childhood Center, located on the site of the former Wlmer Elementary School, opened.

Dallas County residents are zoned to Dallas College (formerly Dallas County Community College or DCCCD).

School histories

Wilmer-Hutchins Independent School District used to serve Wilmer. Until the end of the school district, Wilmer Elementary School was located in Wilmer. In addition, Kennedy-Curry Middle School and Wilmer-Hutchins High School in Dallas, then under WHISD control, served Wilmer. WHISD was closed after spring 2005 with official termination in June 2006. After the closure of WHISD property values in the district increased.

From 2005 to 2009 Wilmer was served by various DISD schools. From 2005 to 2006 to 2008–2009 W. W. Bushman, B. F. Darrell, J. N. Ervin, and Whitney M. Young elementary schools served sections of Wilmer. From 2009–2010 to 2010–2011 only Bushman, Ervin, and Young served sections of Wilmer.

In the 2005–2006 and the 2006–2007 school years Sarah Zumwalt Middle School served as Wilmer's middle school. From 2006–2007 to 2010–2011 Zumwalt (Darrell, Young, and Ervin zones) and Maynard H. Jackson Middle School (Bushman zone) served portions of Wilmer.

From 2005–2006 to 2010–2011 A. Maceo Smith High School served as Wilmer's high school.

Dallas ISD was considering opening a new Wilmer-Hutchins Elementary School building, restoring the Wilmer-Hutchins High School building, and demolishing the Kennedy-Curry Middle School building as part of its 2008 bond campaign. The district will open Wilmer Hutchins Elementary School in an area within the City of Dallas in 2011. In November 2010 DISD announced that three schools (Wilmer Hutchins ES, Kennedy-Curry Middle School, and Wilmer-Hutchins HS) would open/re-open in the Wilmer-Hutchins area in 2011.

The charter school group Honors Academy previously operated Wilmer Academy, a K–8 school, in Wilmer.

A new DISD elementary school in Wilmer, named after Eddie Bernice Johnson, opened in 2020.

Government
The Wilmer City Council is composed of a Mayor and five Council Members, which are elected at large on staggered two year terms. The City Council's policy-making duties include adoption of the annual tax rate, water and sewer rates, annual operating budget, and regulatory ordinances. 
The City Council appoints the City Administrator, City Secretary, City Attorney, Municipal Judge, and board and commission members. Meeting agendas, public hearings, legal notices, and city ordinances are published in the official newspaper, Ellis County Press.

City Council Members 

 Sheila Petta, Mayor
 Candy Madrigal, Mayor Pro-Tem
 Jeff Steele, Council Member  
 Phyllis Slough, Council Member
 Sergio Campos, Council Member
 Melissa Ramirez, Council Member

References

External links
 City of Wilmer official website 
 Wilmer Economic Development Corporations official website 
 City of Wilmer official website (Archive)
 Wilmer Citizen Activist blog
 The Ellis County Observer, local newspaper
 The Ellis County Press, local newspaper
 "City of Wilmer, Texas COMMUNITY PLAN 2030" (Archive). Adopted June 18, 2009. Ordinance No. 09-0618.

Cities in Dallas County, Texas
Cities in Texas
Dallas–Fort Worth metroplex
Populated places established in 1945